Kari Motor Speedway is a purpose-built Formula 3 auto racing circuit or race track, located in Chettipalayam, Coimbatore, India. The circuit is named after S. Karivardhan.

History
Part of the existing track was used as a runway for power gliders, as a part of an ultralight aviation manufacturing company owned by S. Karivardhan.  The stretch was also used in the late 1990s for drag racing events. In 2002, the land was purchased by former racer B. Vijay Kumar to build a track to conduct national motorsport events and the track was inaugurated in 2003. The track is named after S.Karivardhan, who designed and built entry level race cars.

Activities
The track regularly conducts the National Championship races for go-karts, motorcycle road racing and formula racing events. The track is also approved by the CIK and FIA to hold races up to the Formula 3 category. The category of cars that race in this track include Formula Maruti, Formula LGB, and Formula Rolon Chevrolet. The track is also used by motorcycle clubs, racing and karting schools and others for vehicle tests and driver training. The track also hosts Formula Bharat on a yearly basis since January 2017. Recently the track hosted first edition of FFS India 2017 in October 2017 with its second edition to be conducted in October 2018.

See also
Federation of Motor Sports Clubs of India
SAEINDIA
Indian National Rally Championship
Madras Motor Sports Club

References

External links

 Kari Motor Speedway and Racing in India

Motorsport venues in Tamil Nadu
Sport in Coimbatore
Sports venues in Coimbatore
2003 establishments in Tamil Nadu
Sports venues completed in 2003